Girl's rhythmic individual all-around competition at the 2010 Summer Youth Olympics was held at the Bishan Sports Hall.

There were two rounds of competition in the individual competition. In each round, competing gymnasts performed four routines. One routine was performed with each of the four apparatus: rope, hoop, ball and clubs. The combined scores from the four routines made up the preliminary round score. The top eight gymnasts after the preliminary round advanced to the finals. There, they performed each routine again. Preliminary scores were ignored, and the top combined final scores won.

Medalists

Qualification

Final

References 
 Qualification
 Final

Gymnastics at the 2010 Summer Youth Olympics
Women's sports competitions in Singapore
2010 in women's gymnastics